Vinicio Salmi (born 3 July 1956) is an Italian former Grand Prix motorcycle road racer and racing driver from Ferrara.

Salmi competed in the 1977 250cc motorcycle road racing world championship on a Yamaha. His best result was a fourth-place finish at the 1977 250cc German Grand Prix held at the Hockenheimring circuit.

He competed in the FIA European Formula Three Championship part-time from 1979 to 1981 and Italian Formula Three in 1981. He raced motorcycles from 1982 until 1988. In 1989 he returned to professional racing in the American Racing Series which would later be known as Indy Lights. In 1990 he captured a win in Vancouver and finished 9th in series points despite missing the first four races of the season. He entered but failed to qualify for the 1991 Indianapolis 500. In 1992, he competed in a partial road course season in the CART Indy Car World Series for Euromotorsport using an outdated Lola chassis. His best finish was 15th place at Road America and he scored no championship points. Little has been heard of him after his CART experience.

References 

1956 births
Sportspeople from Ferrara
Italian motorcycle racers
Italian racing drivers
Champ Car drivers
Indy Lights drivers
FIA European Formula 3 Championship drivers
Italian Formula Three Championship drivers
250cc World Championship riders
Living people

EuroInternational drivers